Jim Ott (born June 5, 1947) is an American politician and former television meteorologist.  A Republican, he was a seven term member of the Wisconsin State Assembly representing assembly district 23, serving from 2007 to 2021.  Before being elected to the Assembly, he was a broadcast meteorologist in Milwaukee for Journal Communications's WTMJ-TV and WTMJ-AM radio.

Early life and career
Jim Ott was born in Milwaukee, Wisconsin, and graduated from Milwaukee's Washington High School in 1965.  He earned his bachelor's degree from the University of Wisconsin–Milwaukee in 1970, and then joined the United States Army.  He served three years in the Army with the U.S. Army Security Agency, including a tour in Vietnam in 1971–72.  Following his Army service, he returned to school at UW–Milwaukee and obtained his master's degree in 1975.

After earning his master's degree, in 1976 he went to work as an on-air meteorologist for Journal Communications on their WTMJ-TV television and WTMJ-AM radio stations.  He worked there for 30 years, leaving only when he was elected to the Wisconsin State Assembly in 2006.  During his time at Journal Communications, he became a member of the unit holders' council, chairperson of stock and information committee, and employee representative on the board of directors.

He returned to school and obtained his J.D. from Marquette University Law School in 2000.

While working as a meteorologist, he also served as adjunct faculty at University of Wisconsin–Parkside, University of Wisconsin–Milwaukee, Cardinal Stritch University, Carroll University, and Marquette University Law School.

Political career
Following the April 2006 announcement that incumbent state representative Curt Gielow would not seek re-election in 2006, Ott declared his candidacy for office.  In the Republican primary, Ott defeated John Wirth and went on to win the general election with 56% of the vote over Democrat Stanley F. Teplin.  He went on to win re-election six times.

He was defeated for reelection by Democrat Deb Andraca on November 3, 2020.

Personal life and family
Jim Ott is married with two adult sons, he and his wife reside in Mequon, Wisconsin.  He has been a member of the 
Lumen Christi Catholic Parish in Mequon since 1986.  He is a member of the American Legion and the American Meteorological Society.

Electoral history

Wisconsin Assembly (2006, 2008)

| colspan="6" style="text-align:center;background-color: #e9e9e9;"| Republican Primary, September 12, 2006

| colspan="6" style="text-align:center;background-color: #e9e9e9;"| General Election, November 7, 2006

Wisconsin Assembly (2018, 2020)

| colspan="6" style="text-align:center;background-color: #e9e9e9;"| General Election, November 6, 2018

| colspan="6" style="text-align:center;background-color: #e9e9e9;"| General Election, November 3, 2020

References

External links

Representative Jim Ott at Wisconsin Legislature
Official website
Campaign website
Lumen Christi Parish

Living people
American television meteorologists
Journalists from Wisconsin
1947 births
Politicians from Milwaukee
Marquette University alumni
21st-century American politicians
People from Mequon, Wisconsin
Catholics from Wisconsin
United States Army personnel of the Vietnam War
Republican Party members of the Wisconsin State Assembly